WRJC-FM (92.1 FM, "NOW 92ONE FM") is a radio station broadcasting a hot adult contemporary format. Licensed to Mauston, Wisconsin, United States, the station serves the Wisconsin Dells area. The station is currently owned by Murphy's Law Media Group, LLC and features programming from CBS News Radio.

References

External links
WRJC-FM website

RJC-FM
Hot adult contemporary radio stations in the United States
Radio stations established in 1997